William H. Ahearn (1858 – April 28, 1919) was a Major League Baseball catcher, at least for one day, during the 1880 season. He was born in Troy, New York.

Ahearn played in one game for the Troy Trojans of the National League on June 19, 1880. Behind the plate, he had two putouts, five assists, and two errors for a fielding percentage of .778. He also had seven passed balls. At the plate, he went 1-for-4 for a .250 batting average, and he scored one run. The Trojans lost the game to the Cleveland Spiders 18-6. It was played at Haymakers' Grounds in Troy, New York. Ahearn died in Troy on April 28, 1919.

External links

 Baseball Almanac
 Retrosheet

1858 births
1919 deaths
Baseball players from New York (state)
Major League Baseball catchers
Troy Trojans players
19th-century baseball players
Sportspeople from Troy, New York